The 2018–19 Aris Thessaloniki B.C. season was the 65th appearance in the top-tier level Greek Basket League for Aris Thessaloniki. The club also competed in the Greek Basketball Cup where was eliminated by Promitheas Patras in Phase 2. 

In Europe Aris Thessaloniki was eliminated in Second qualifying round of Basketball Champions League by Russian Nizhny Novgorod. As a loser of BCL's qualifying rounds the club participated in FIBA Europe Cup. Aris Thessaloniki finished in 3rd place of Group G in Regular season and was eliminated.  

The club changed its manager in December and hired Ioannis Kastritis

First-team squad

Competitions

Overall

Overview

Manager's Overview

Vangelis Angelou

Ioannis Kastritis

Greek Basket League

Regular season

Standings

Results overview

Matches

Greek Cup

Phase 2

Basketball Champions League

First qualifying round

Second qualifying round

FIBA Europe Cup

Regular season

Group table

Results overview

Matches

Players' Statistics

Basket League

Shooting

Last updated: 8 May 2019
Source: ESAKE

Greek Cup

Shooting

Last updated: 3 October 2018
Source: gazzetta.gr

Basketball Champions League

Shooting

Last updated: 28 September 2018
Source: www.championsleague.basketball

FIBA Europe Cup

Shooting

Last updated: 21 November 2018
Source: www.fiba.basketball/europecup

Double-Double

References

Aris B.C. seasons